Augustinus Hendricus Martinus (Guus) Albregts (22 November 1900, in Vught – 8 June 1980, in 's-Hertogenbosch) was a Dutch economist and politician. As a member of the Catholic People's Party (KVP) he was a minister without portfolio, dealing with enhancing productivity in the first Drees cabinet from 1951 to 1952.

He studied and lectured economy at Tilburg University.

In 1952 he was awarded Knight of the Order of the Netherlands Lion.

References 
  Parlement.com biography

1900 births
1980 deaths
Catholic People's Party politicians
20th-century Dutch politicians
Knights of the Order of the Netherlands Lion
Ministers without portfolio of the Netherlands
People from Vught
Tilburg University alumni
Academic staff of Tilburg University
20th-century Dutch economists